RAVON (Robust Autonomous Vehicle for Off-road Navigation) is a robot being developed at the Robotics Research Lab at University of Kaiserslautern, Germany. The vehicle is used as a testbed to investigate behaviour-based strategies on motion adaptation, localization and navigation in rough outdoor terrain. The basis vehicle was produced by Robosoft.

Description 
The vehicle uses a 3D laser scanner.

The vehicle is an example of using behavior-based components on two layers of a multi-layer control system. It also uses a form of short-term memory to prevent collisions with obstacles that it observed some time ago.

The vehicle was experimentally tested at the 2nd Military European Land Robot Trial 2008.

Technical specifications
Length: 2.35 m
Width: 1.4 m
Height: 1.2 m
Weight: 750 kg
Power Supply: 8 spiral cell batteries (12 V, 55 Ah each)
Operation Time: about 4 hours
Drive: 4WD with four independent electric motors
Steering: front and rear wheel steering via linear motors
Velocity: 10 km/h max.
Controller: 2 Motorola 56F803 DSPs
Computer: 4 On-board PCs
Floor Clearance: 0.3 m
Max. Slope: 100% (at 7 km/h)

References

External links
Robotics Research Lab
University of Kaiserslautern
Official Website of Ravon

Robits